The Fourth Industrial Revolution, 4IR, or Industry 4.0, conceptualises rapid change to technology, industries, and societal patterns and processes in the 21st century due to increasing interconnectivity and smart automation. The term was popularised in 2015 by Klaus Schwab, the World Economic Forum founder and executive chairman, and has since been used in numerous economic, political, and scientific articles in reference to the current era of emerging high technology. Schwab asserts that the changes seen are more than just improvements to efficiency, but express a significant shift in industrial capitalism.

A part of this phase of industrial change is the joining of technologies like artificial intelligence, gene editing, to advanced robotics that blur the lines between the physical, digital, and biological worlds.

Throughout this, fundamental shifts are taking place in how the global production and supply network operates through ongoing automation of traditional manufacturing and industrial practices, using modern smart technology, large-scale machine-to-machine communication (M2M), and the internet of things (IoT). This integration results in increasing automation, improving communication and self-monitoring, and the use of smart machines that can analyse and diagnose issues without the need for human intervention.

It also represents a social, political, and economic shift from the digital age of the late 1990s and early 2000s to an era of embedded connectivity distinguished by the omni-use and commonness of technological use throughout society (e.g. a metaverse) that changes the ways humans experience and know the world around them. It posits that we have created and are entering an augmented social reality compared to just the natural senses and industrial ability of humans alone.

History 
The phrase Fourth Industrial Revolution was first introduced by a team of scientists developing a high-tech strategy for the German government. Klaus Schwab, executive chairman of the World Economic Forum (WEF), introduced the phrase to a wider audience in a 2015 article published by Foreign Affairs. "Mastering the Fourth Industrial Revolution" was the 2016 theme of the World Economic Forum Annual Meeting, in Davos-Klosters, Switzerland.

On 10 October 2016, the Forum announced the opening of its Centre for the Fourth Industrial Revolution in San Francisco. This was also subject and title of Schwab's 2016 book. Schwab includes in this fourth era technologies that combine hardware, software, and biology (cyber-physical systems), and emphasises advances in communication and connectivity. Schwab expects this era to be marked by breakthroughs in emerging technologies in fields such as robotics, artificial intelligence, nanotechnology, quantum computing, biotechnology, the internet of things, the industrial internet of things, decentralised consensus, fifth-generation wireless technologies, 3D printing, and fully autonomous vehicles.

In The Great Reset proposal by the WEF, The Fourth Industrial Revolution is included as a strategic intelligence in the solution to rebuild the economy sustainably following the COVID-19 pandemic.

First Industrial Revolution 

The First Industrial Revolution was marked by a transition from hand production methods to machines through the use of steam power and water power. The implementation of new technologies took a long time, so the period which this refers to was between 1760 and 1820, or 1840 in Europe and the United States. Its effects had consequences on textile manufacturing, which was first to adopt such changes, as well as iron industry, agriculture, and mining although it also had societal effects with an ever stronger middle class.

Second Industrial Revolution 

The Second Industrial Revolution, also known as the Technological Revolution, is the period between 1871 and 1914 that resulted from installations of extensive railroad and telegraph networks, which allowed for faster transfer of people and ideas, as well as electricity. Increasing electrification allowed for factories to develop the modern production line. It was a period of great economic growth, with an increase in productivity, which also caused a surge in unemployment since many factory workers were replaced by machines.

Third Industrial Revolution 

The Third Industrial Revolution, also known as the Digital Revolution, occurred in the late 20th century, after the end of the two world wars, resulting from a slowdown of industrialisation and technological advancement compared to previous periods. The production of the Z1 computer, which used binary floating-point numbers and Boolean logic, a decade later, was the beginning of more advanced digital developments. The next significant development in communication technologies was the supercomputer, with extensive use of computer and communication technologies in the production process; machinery began to abrogate the need for human power.

Fourth Industrial Revolution 
In essence, the Fourth Industrial Revolution is the trend towards automation and data exchange in manufacturing technologies and processes which include cyber-physical systems (CPS), IoT, industrial internet of things, cloud computing, cognitive computing, and artificial intelligence.

The machines cannot replace the deep expertise but they tend to be more efficient than humans in performing repetitive functions, and the combination of machine learning and computational power allows machines to carry out highly complicated tasks.

The Fourth Industrial Revolution (4IR) has been defined as technological developments in cyber-physical systems such as high capacity connectivity; new human-machine interaction modes such as touch interfaces and virtual reality systems; and improvements in transferring digital instructions to the physical world including robotics and 3D printing (additive manufacturing); the Internet of Things (IoT); "big data" and cloud computing; artificial intelligence-based systems; improvements to and uptake of Off-Grid / Stand-Alone Renewable Energy Systems: solar, wind, wave, hydroelectric and the electric batteries (lithium-ion renewable energy storage systems (ESS) and EV). 

The Fourth Industrial Revolution marks the beginning of the imagination age.

Key themes
Industry 4.0 increases operational efficiency.
Four themes are presented that summarise an Industry 4.0:
 Interconnection – the ability of machines, devices, sensors, and people to connect and communicate with each other via the Internet of things, or the internet of people (IoP)
 Information transparency – the transparency afforded by Industry 4.0 technology provides operators with comprehensive information to make decisions. Inter-connectivity allows operators to collect immense amounts of data and information from all points in the manufacturing process, identify key areas that can benefit from improvement to increase functionality
 Technical assistance – the technological facility of systems to assist humans in decision-making and problem-solving, and the ability to help humans with difficult or unsafe tasks
 Decentralized decisions – the ability of cyber physical systems to make decisions on their own and to perform their tasks as autonomously as possible. Only in the case of exceptions, interference, or conflicting goals, are tasks delegated to a higher level

Distinctiveness
Proponents of the Fourth Industrial Revolution suggest it is a distinct revolution rather than simply a prolongation of the Third Industrial Revolution. This is due to the following characteristics: 
 Velocity — exponential speed at which incumbent industries are affected and displaced
 Scope and systems impact – the large amount of sectors and firms that are affected
 Paradigm shift in technology policy – new policies designed for this new way of doing are present. An example is Singapore's formal recognition of Industry 4.0 in its innovation policies.

Critics of the concept dismiss Industry 4.0 as a marketing strategy. They suggest that although revolutionary changes are identifiable in distinct sectors, there is no systemic change so far. In addition, the pace of recognition of Industry 4.0 and policy transition varies across countries; the definition of Industry 4.0 is not harmonised. One of the most known figures is Jeremy Rifkin who "agree[s] that digitalization is the hallmark and defining technology in what has become known as the Third Industrial Revolution". However, he argues that "that the evolution of digitalization has barely begun to run its course and that its new configuration in the form of the Internet of Things represents the next stage of its development".

Components 

The application of the Fourth Industrial Revolution operates through:
 Mobile devices
 Internet of things (IoT) platforms
 Location detection technologies (electronic identification)
 Advanced human-machine interfaces
 Authentication and fraud detection
 Smart sensors
 Big analytics and advanced processes
 Multilevel customer interaction and customer profiling
 Augmented reality/wearables
 On-demand availability of computer system resources
 Data visualisation and triggered "live" training

Mainly these technologies can be summarised into four major components, defining the term "Industry 4.0" or "smart factory":
 Cyber-physical systems
 Internet of things (IoT)
 On-demand availability of computer system resources (e.g. cloud computing)
 Cognitive computing

Industry 4.0 networks a wide range of new technologies to create value. Using cyber-physical systems that monitor physical processes, a virtual copy of the physical world can be designed. Characteristics of cyber-physical systems include the ability to make decentralised decisions independently, reaching a high degree of autonomy.

The value created in Industry 4.0, can be relied upon electronic identification, in which the smart manufacturing require set technologies to be incorporated in the manufacturing process to thus be classified as in the development path of Industry 4.0 and no longer digitisation.

Primary drivers

Digitization and integration of vertical and horizontal value chains 
Industry 4.0 integrates processes vertically, across the entire organisation, including processes in product development, manufacturing, structuring, and service; horizontally, Industry 4.0 includes internal operations from suppliers to customers as well as all key value chain partners.

Digitization of product and services 
Integrating new methods of data collection and analysis–such as through the expansion of existing products or creation of new digitised products–helps companies to generate data on product use to refine products

Digital business models and customer access 
Customer satisfaction is a perpetual, multi-stage process that requires modification in real-time to adapt to the changing needs of consumers

Trends

Smart factory 

Smart Factory is the vision of a production environment in which production facilities and logistics systems are organised without human intervention.

The Smart Factory is no longer a vision. While different model factories represent the feasible, many enterprises already clarify with examples practically, how the Smart Factory functions.

The technical foundations on which the Smart Factory – the intelligent factory – is based are cyber-physical systems that communicate with each other using the Internet of Things and Services. An important part of this process is the exchange of data between the product and the production line. This enables a much more efficient connection of the Supply Chain and better organisation within any production environment.

The Fourth Industrial Revolution fosters what has been called a "smart factory". Within modular structured smart factories, cyber-physical systems monitor physical processes, create a virtual copy of the physical world and make decentralised decisions. Over the internet of things, cyber-physical systems communicate and cooperate with each other and with humans in synchronic time both internally and across organizational services offered and used by participants of the value chain.

Predictive maintenance 
Industry 4.0 can also provide predictive maintenance, due to the use of technology and the IoT sensors. Predictive maintenance – which can identify maintenance issues in real time – allows machine owners to perform cost-effective maintenance and determine it ahead of time before the machinery fails or gets damaged.  For example, a company in Los Angeles could understand if a piece of equipment in Singapore is running at an abnormal speed or temperature. They could then decide whether or not it needs to be repaired.

3D printing 

The Fourth Industrial Revolution is said to have extensive dependency on 3D printing technology.  Some advantages of 3D printing for industry are that 3D printing can print many geometric structures, as well as simplify the product design process. It is also relatively environmentally friendly. In low-volume production, it can also decrease lead times and total production costs. Moreover, it can increase flexibility, reduce warehousing costs and help the company towards the adoption of a mass customisation business strategy. In addition, 3D printing can be very useful for printing spare parts and installing it locally, therefore reducing supplier dependence and reducing the supply lead time.

The determining factor is the pace of change. The correlation of the speed of technological development and, as a result, socio-economic and infrastructural transformations with human life allows one to state a qualitative leap in the speed of development, which marks a transition to a new time era.

Smart sensors 

Sensors and instrumentation drive the central forces of innovation, not only for Industry 4.0 but also for other "smart" megatrends, such as smart production, smart mobility, smart homes, smart cities, and smart factories.

Smart sensors are devices, which generate the data and allow further functionality from self-monitoring and self-configuration to condition monitoring of complex processes. 
With the capability of wireless communication, they reduce installation effort to a great extent and help realise a dense array of sensors.

The importance of sensors, measurement science, and smart evaluation for Industry 4.0 has been recognised and acknowledged by various experts and has already led to the statement "Industry 4.0: nothing goes without sensor systems."

However, there are a few issues, such as time synchronisation error, data loss, and dealing with large amounts of harvested data, which all limit the implementation of full-fledged systems. Moreover, additional limits on these functionalities represents the battery power. One example of the integration of smart sensors in the electronic devices, is the case of smart watches, where sensors receive the data from the movement of the user, process the data and as a result, provide the user with the information about how many steps they have walked in a day and also converts the  data into calories burned.

Agriculture and food industries 

Smart sensors in these two fields are still in the testing stage. These innovative connected sensors collect, interpret and communicate the information available in the plots (leaf area, vegetation index, chlorophyll, hygrometry, temperature, water potential, radiation). Based on this scientific data, the objective is to enable real-time monitoring via a smartphone with a range of advice that optimises plot management in terms of results, time and costs. On the farm, these sensors can be used to detect crop stages and recommend inputs and treatments at the right time. As well as controlling the level of irrigation.

The food industry requires more and more security and transparency and full documentation is required. This new technology is used as a tracking system as well as the collection of human data and product data.

Accelerated transition to the knowledge economy 

Knowledge economy is an economic system in which production and services are largely based on knowledge-intensive activities that contribute to an accelerated pace of technical and scientific advance, as well as rapid obsolescence. Industry 4.0 aids transitions into knowledge economy by increasing reliance on intellectual capabilities than on physical inputs or natural resources.

Challenges 
Challenges in implementation of Industry 4.0:

Economic 
 High economic costs
 Business model adaptation
 Unclear economic benefits/excessive investment

Social 
 Privacy concerns
 Surveillance and distrust
 General reluctance to change by stakeholders
 Threat of redundancy of the corporate IT department
 Loss of many jobs to automatic processes and IT-controlled processes, especially for blue collar workers
Increased risk of gender inequalities in professions with job roles most susceptible to replacement with AI

Political 
 Lack of regulation, standards and forms of certifications
 Unclear legal issues and data security

Organizational 
 IT security issues, which are greatly aggravated by the inherent need to open up previously closed production shops
 Reliability and stability needed for critical machine-to-machine communication (M2M), including very short and stable latency times
 Need to maintain the integrity of production processes
 Need to avoid any IT snags, as those would cause expensive production outages
 Need to protect industrial know-how (contained also in the control files for the industrial automation gear)
 Lack of adequate skill-sets to expedite the transition towards a fourth industrial revolution
 Low top management commitment
 Insufficient qualification of employees

Country applications 
Many countries have set up institutional mechanisms to foster the adoption of Industry 4.0 technologies. For example,

Australia 
Australia has a Digital Transformation Agency (est. 2015) and the Prime Minister's Industry 4.0 Taskforce (est. 2016), which promotes collaboration with industry groups in Germany and the USA.

Germany 
The term "Industrie 4.0", shortened to I4.0 or simply I4, originated in 2011 from a project in the high-tech strategy of the German government and specifically relates to that project policy, rather than a wider notion of a Fourth Industrial Revolution of 4IR, which promotes the computerisation of manufacturing. The term "Industrie 4.0" was publicly introduced in the same year at the Hannover Fair. Renowned German professor Wolfgang Wahlster is sometimes called the inventor of the "Industry 4.0" term. In October 2012, the Working Group on Industry 4.0 presented a set of Industry 4.0 implementation recommendations to the German federal government. The workgroup members and partners are recognised as the founding fathers and driving force behind Industry 4.0. On 8 April 2013 at the Hannover Fair, the final report of the Working Group Industry 4.0 was presented. This working group was headed by Siegfried Dais, of Robert Bosch GmbH, and Henning Kagermann, of the German Academy of Science and Engineering.

As Industry 4.0 principles have been applied by companies, they have sometimes been rebranded. For example, the aerospace parts manufacturer Meggitt PLC has branded its own Industry 4.0 research project M4.

The discussion of how the shift to Industry 4.0, especially digitisation, will affect the labour market is being discussed in Germany under the topic of Work 4.0.

The federal government in Germany through its ministries of the BMBF and BMWi, is a leader in the development of the I4.0 policy. Through the publishing of set objectives and goals for enterprises to achieve, the German federal government attempts to set the direction of the digital transformation. However, there is a gap between German enterprise's collaboration and knowledge of these set policies. The biggest challenge which SMEs in Germany are currently facing regarding digital transformation of their manufacturing processes is ensuring that there is a concrete IT and application landscape to support further digital transformation efforts.

The characteristics of the German government's Industry 4.0 strategy involve the strong customisation of products under the conditions of highly flexible (mass-) production. The required automation technology is improved by the introduction of methods of self-optimization, self-configuration, self-diagnosis, cognition and intelligent support of workers in their increasingly complex work. The largest project in Industry 4.0 as of July 2013 is the German Federal Ministry of Education and Research (BMBF) leading-edge cluster "Intelligent Technical Systems Ostwestfalen-Lippe (its OWL)". Another major project is the BMBF project RES-COM, as well as the Cluster of Excellence "Integrative Production Technology for High-Wage Countries". In 2015, the European Commission started the international Horizon 2020 research project CREMA (Providing Cloud-based Rapid Elastic Manufacturing based on the XaaS and Cloud model) as a major initiative to foster the Industry 4.0 topic.

Estonia 
In Estonia, the digital transformation dubbed as the 4th Industrial Revolution by Klaus Schwab and the World Economic Forum in 2015 started with the restoration of independence in 1991. Although a latecomer to the information revolution due to 50 years of Soviet occupation, Estonia leapfrogged to the digital era, while skipping the analogue connections almost completely. The early decisions made by Prime Minister Mart Laar on the course of the country's economic development led to the establishment of what is today known as e-Estonia, one of the worlds most digitally advanced nations. 

According to the goals set in the Estonia's Digital Agenda 2030, next leaps in the country's digital transformation will be switching to event based and proactive services, both in private and business environment, as well as developing a green, AI-powered and human-centric digital government.

Indonesia 
Another example is Making Indonesia 4.0, with a focus on improving industrial performance.

South Africa 
South Africa appointed a Presidential Commission on the Fourth Industrial Revolution in 2019, consisting of about 30 stakeholders with a background in academia, industry and government. South Africa has also established an Inter ministerial Committee on Industry 4.0.

South Korea 
The Republic of Korea has had a Presidential Committee on the Fourth Industrial Revolution since 2017.  The Republic of Korea's I-Korea strategy (2017) is focusing on new growth engines that include AI, drones and autonomous cars, in line with the government's innovation-driven economic policy.

Spain
See Science and technology in Spain

Uganda 
Uganda adopted its own National 4IR Strategy in October 2020 with emphasis on e-governance, urban management (smart cities), health care, education, agriculture and the digital economy; to support local businesses, the government was contemplating introducing a local start-ups bill in 2020 which would require all accounting officers to exhaust the local market prior to procuring digital solutions from abroad.

United Kingdom 
In a policy paper published in 2019, the UK's Department for Business, Energy & Industrial Strategy, titled "Regulation for the Fourth Industrial Revolution", outlined the need to evolve current regulatory models to remain competitive in evolving technological and social settings.

United States 
The Department of Homeland Security in 2019 published a paper called 'The Industrial Internet of things (IIOT): Opportunities, Risks, Mitigation'. The base pieces of critical infrastructure are increasingly digitised for greater connectivity and optimisation. Hence, its implementation, growth and maintenance must be carefully planned and safeguarded. The paper discusses not only applications of IIOT but also the associated risks. It has suggested some key areas where risk mitigation is possible. To increase coordination between the public, private, law enforcement, academia and other stakeholders the DHS formed the National Cybersecurity and Communications Integration Center (NCCIC).

Industry applications 
The aerospace industry has sometimes been characterised as "too low volume for extensive automation"; however, Industry 4.0 principles have been investigated by several aerospace companies, and technologies have been developed to improve productivity where the upfront cost of automation cannot be justified. One example of this is the aerospace parts manufacturer Meggitt PLC's M4 project.

The increasing use of the industrial internet of things is referred to as Industry 4.0 at Bosch, and generally in Germany. Applications include machines that can predict failures and trigger maintenance processes autonomously or self-organised coordination that react to unexpected changes in production. in 2017, Bosch launched the  Connectory, a Chicago, Illinois based innovation incubator that specializes in IoT, including Industry 4.0.

Industry 4.0 inspired Innovation 4.0, a move toward digitisation for academia and research and development. In 2017, the £81M Materials Innovation Factory (MIF) at the University of Liverpool opened as a center for computer aided materials science, where robotic formulation, data capture and modelling are being integrated into development practices.

Criticism 
With the consistent development on automation of everyday tasks, some saw the benefit in the exact opposite of automation where self-made products are valued more than those that involved automation. This valuation is named the IKEA effect, a term coined by Michael I. Norton of Harvard Business School, Daniel Mochon of Yale, and Dan Ariely of Duke.

See also
 Advanced manufacturing
 Computer-integrated manufacturing
 Digital modelling and fabrication
 Industrial control system
 Intelligent maintenance systems
 Lights-out manufacturing
 Machine to machine
 Cyber manufacturing
 Work 4.0
 World Economic Forum 2016
 Simulation software
 The War on Normal People
 List of emerging technologies
Technological unemployment
Technological singularity

References

Sources
 

2015 neologisms
21st century
Industrial automation
Industrial computing
Internet of things
Technology forecasting
Big data
Industrial Revolution
Fourth Industrial Revolution
World Economic Forum